Eric Meyer may refer to:

 Eric Meyer (musician) (born 1966), former Dark Angel guitarist
 Eric Meyer (politician) (born 1961), member of the Arizona House of Representatives
 Eric A. Meyer, American web design consultant and author
 Eric K. Meyer (born 1953), University of Illinois journalism professor

See also
Eric Meyers (disambiguation)